Pterostylis major is a plant in the orchid family Orchidaceae and is endemic to New South Wales where it grows on the Northern Tablelands. As with similar greenhoods, the flowering plants differ from those which are not flowering. The non-flowering plants have a rosette  of leaves on a short stalk but the flowering plants lack a rosette and have up to eleven well-spaced, bright green flowers with darker stripes, on a flowering stem with stem leaves.

Description
Pterostylis major is a terrestrial, perennial, deciduous, herb with an underground tuber. The dorsal sepal and petals are joined to form a hood called the "galea" over the column. Flowering occurs from April to September.

Taxonomy and naming
This species was first formally described in 2006 by David Jones and given the name Bunochilus major (although initially the orthographical variant Bunochilus majus). The description was published in the journal Australian Orchid Research from a specimen collected along the Point Lookout Road from the Waterfall Way. In 2010, Gary Backhouse changed the name to Pterostylis major. The specific epithet (major) is a Latin word meaning "large" or "great", referring to the larger size of this species compared to the similar Pterostylis longifolia.

Distribution and habitat
Pterostylis major grows with grasses and shrubs in tall forest on the New England Tableland and south to the Barrington Tops.

References

major
Endemic orchids of Australia
Orchids of New South Wales
Plants described in 2006